Kauchuk is a village in Almaty Region, in south-eastern Kazakhstan, 594 mi or 957 km southeast of Nur-Sultan, the country's capital.

References

Populated places in Almaty Region